House Full or Houseful or variation, may refer to:

Films
 Housefull (1999 film), a Tamil film starring R. Parthiban, Vikram and Roja
 Houseful (2009 film), a Bengali film
 Housefull (film series), a Bollywood film series
 Housefull (2010 film), a 2010 Hindi film starring Arjun Rampal, Akshay Kumar, Soeradj Smj, Deepika Padukone and Lara Dutta
 Housefull 2, a 2012 Hindi sequel to the 2010 film starring Akshay Kumar, Jacqueline Fernandez, John Abraham and Asin
 Housefull 3, a 2016 Hindi sequel starring Akshay Kumar, Abhishek Bachchan, Riteish Deshmukh, Jacqueline Fernandez, Nargis Fakhri, and Lisa Haydon
 Housefull (2013 film), a Malayalam film starring Tini Tom and Jyothirmayi

TV
 House Full (TV series), a Bangladeshi dramaserial starring Abul Hayat, Mosharraf Karim and Nova

Music
 House Full: Live at the L.A. Troubadour, a 1986 album by Fairport Convention

See also 
 Box office
 Full House (disambiguation)